Menachem Zilberman (6 October 1946 – 13 January 2014) was an Israeli actor, comedian and songwriter.

Menachem Zilberman died from a heart attack on 13 January 2014, aged 67, in Los Angeles, California in the United States, where he had lived since 2000. He was survived by his three children.

References

External links

1946 births
2014 deaths
Beit Zvi School for the Performing Arts alumni
Israeli expatriates in the United States
Israeli male film actors
Israeli male television actors
Israeli male stage actors
Israeli stand-up comedians
Israeli male comedians
Israeli male songwriters
20th-century Israeli male actors
21st-century Israeli male actors